Krnčević is a Croatian surname. Notable people with the surname include:

 Ante Krnčević (1909–1993), Croatian rower
 Daniel Krnćević (1929–1983), Croatian rower
 Eddie Krncevic (born 1960), Australian-born footballer and manager

Croatian surnames